Arild Inge Andresen (1 December 1928 – 27 December 2008) was a Norwegian football and ice hockey player who played for Vålerenga in both sports.

For the football team, he made his debut in 1948, in the inaugural season of the Norwegian Main League. He was capped once for Norway; in 1950, against Sweden. He retired after the 1954 season.

He also played for the club's hockey team. His brothers Thorbjørn (1919–1998) and Ivar (1921–2004) played football for Vålerenga.

Andresen died on 27 December 2008, a few weeks after his eightieth birthday.

References

External links 
 
 

Sportspeople from Oslo
Norwegian footballers
Norway international footballers
Vålerenga Fotball players
Vålerenga Ishockey players
Norwegian ice hockey players
1928 births
2008 deaths
Association football goalkeepers